Perissa is a village on the island of Santorini, Greece. It is located 13 km to the southeast of Fira, near the Messa Vouno rock.

According to the 2011 census, Perissa has 678 permanent inhabitants. It is part of the community of Emporio.

Perissa boasts magnificent beaches on the Aegean including Perissa Beach itself. There are the remnants of the ancient Early Christian church of Saint Irene; its contracted form is the present name of the island, Santorini.

References

External links

Santorini
Populated places in Thira (regional unit)